The Mengzhuang railway station is a railway station on Zhengzhou–Xinzheng Airport intercity railway in Zhengzhou, Henan, China.

The station is served by Gangqu North station also on Chengjiao line.

References

Railway stations in Henan
Railway stations in Zhengzhou
Stations on the Zhengzhou–Xinzheng Airport Intercity Railway
Railway stations in China opened in 2015